Maria Teresa de Mascarenhas Horta Barros (born 20 May 1937, Lisbon) is a Portuguese feminist poet, journalist and activist. She is one of the authors of the book Novas Cartas Portugesas (New Portuguese Letters), together with Maria Isabel Barreno and Maria Velho da Costa. The authors, known as the "Three Marias," were arrested, jailed and prosecuted under Portuguese censorship laws in 1972, during the last years of the Estado Novo dictatorship. The book and their trial inspired protests in Portugal and attracted international attention from European and American women's liberation groups in the years leading up to the Carnation Revolution.

Biography
She has a bachelor's degree from the Universidade de Lisboa and has worked as a journalist. She took part in the Portuguese Feminist Movement with Maria Isabel Barreno and Maria Velho da Costa (the Three Marias) and was a member of the Poesia 61 group.

Her writing has been published in such journals as Diário de Lisboa, A Capital, República, O Século, Diário de Notícias and Jornal de Letras e Artes, and she was editor in chief of Mulheres magazine.

She is the daughter of Jorge Augusto da Silva Horta, Bastonary of the Ordem dos Médicos (Medical Association of Portugal) and a university professor, and his wife D. Carlota Maria Mascarenhas, of the Marquesses of Fronteira, Counts of Torre and Counts of Coculim, and also Marquesses of Alorna (formerly Marquesses of Castelo Novo) and Counts of Assumar.

She was married to Luís Barros, until his death in November 20, 2019. Her son, Luís Jorge Horta Barros, born on April 4, 1965, is married to Maria Antónia Martins Peças Pereira and has two sons, Bé and Tiago Horta Barros.

Works
Espelho Inicial (1960) (poetry)
Tatuagem (1961)
Cidadelas Submersas (1961)
Verão Coincidente (1962)
Amor Habitado (1963)
Candelabro (1964)
Jardim de Inverno (1966)
Cronista Não é Recado (1967)
Minha Senhora de Mim (1967) (poetry)
Ambas as Mãos sobre o Corpo (1970)
Novas Cartas Portuguesas (1971)
Ana (1974)
Poesia Completa I e II(1983)
Os Anjos (1983)
O Transfer (1984)
Ema (1984)
Minha Mãe, Meu Amor (1984)
Rosa Sangrenta (1987)
Antologia Política (1994)
A Paixão Segundo Constança H. (1994)
O Destino (1997)
A Mãe na Literatura Portuguesa (1999)
As Luzes de Leonor (2011)
As Palavras do Corpo – Antologia de Poesia Erótica (2012)
A Dama e o Unicórnio (2013)
Anunciações (2016)

In Translation
 "Seven Poems from Poesia Reunida (Collected Poetry)". Trans. Dean Thomas Ellis, The Puritan # 25 (Spring 2014 Supplement).
 Point of Honour: Selected Poems of Maria Teresa Horta. Trans. Lesley Saunders. (Two Rivers Press Ltd, 2019)

References

1937 births
Living people
21st-century Portuguese women writers
20th-century Portuguese women writers
Portuguese women novelists
People from Lisbon
Portuguese women poets
20th-century novelists
Portuguese feminists